Joseph J. Mokwa was appointed St. Louis' 32nd Commissioner of the St. Louis Metropolitan Police Department. was an officer for 37 years and Chief for 7½ years in the Metropolitan Police Department, City of St. Louis. Mokwa retired amidst controversy in late July 2008.

He was previously St Louis' Police Chief from 2001 to 2008.

Career

Col. Mokwa joined the Metropolitan Police Department, City of St. Louis on February 8, 1971.  He was promoted to Police Commissioner on May 11, 2001.  He was the city's 32nd Chief of Police.

During his 34-year career Mokwa served in almost every unit of the Department.  His first assignment as a patrol officer was in the Sixth District.  He worked in the Fourth, Fifth, Sixth and Ninth Districts as an officer and as a supervisor.  As an investigator he worked in the District Detective Bureau as well as the Intelligence Unit and the Internal Affairs Division. Prior to being promoted to Chief of Police, he served as the Assistant Chief of Police, responsible for the Bureau of Professional Standards, which includes the Internal Affairs, Police Academy, Information Services (Technology) and Special Services Divisions.

References

External links
 Mokwa's tenure as Chief, as compiled by the St. Louis Post-Dispatch

Living people
1959 births
Commissioners of the St. Louis Metropolitan Police Department
Webster University alumni